Gong Myung (born Kim Dong-hyun on May 26, 1994) is a South Korean actor. He is a member of 5urprise. He is known for his roles in the television series The Bride of Habaek (2017), Revolutionary Love (2017), Be Melodramatic (2019), and Lovers of the Red Sky (2021) and box office hit movie Extreme Job (2019).

Career
In 2013, Gong made his acting debut in the web series After School: Lucky or Not together with the members of 5urprise – actor group formed by talent agency Fantagio. He then played supporting roles in MBC historical drama Splendid Politics (2015), SBS romance–comedy drama Entertainer (2017) and tvN romance–comedy series Drinking Solo (2016). Later in 2016, he joined the MBC reality show We Got Married where he was paired with actress Jung Hye-sung.

In 2017, Gong played the leading role in the two-episode drama The Happy Loner which aired on KBS2. The same year he played  Bi-ryeom: God of the Land of the Sky in the fantasy–romance drama The Bride of Habaek and played Kwon Jae-hoon in tvN drama Revolutionary Love.

In 2019, he starred in the action comedy film Extreme Job as Jae-hoon – youngest member of a team of detectives. The film became a major box office success in South Korea, surpassing 10 million ticket sales in just 15 days. It is currently the second most viewed film in South Korean film history. For his role, he received six nominations for Best New Actor at multiple awards ceremonies – winning 2 of them. Later that year, he appeared in historical film Homme Fatale and JTBC TV series Be Melodramatic.

In April 2020, Gong signed with new management agency Saram Entertainment, after his contract with previous management company expired.

In 2021, Gong starred in the historical-fantasy drama Lovers of the Red Sky which aired on SBS. He played the role of Grand Prince Yangmyeong – a leisurely prince who is an expert at painting, calligraphy and poetry. Later the same year, he became a cast member of the third season of tvN  travel variety show House on Wheels.

In 2022, Gong appeared as commander Yi Eokgi in the Kim Han-min's war action film Hansan: Rising Dragon.

Personal life
He has a younger brother, Doyoung (real name Kim Dong-young), who is a member of the boy group NCT.

Military service 
On November 5, 2021, it was reported that Gong had received a summons for mandatory military service.

He enlisted in the military on December 14, 2021 without revealing his location to prevent the spread of COVID-19.and He is scheduled to be discharged from military service on June 13, 2023.

Filmography

Film

Television series

Web series

Television show

Hosting

Music video appearances

Awards and nominations

References

External links

 
 
 
 

1994 births
Living people
People from Guri
20th-century Christians
21st-century Christians
21st-century South Korean male actors
21st-century South Korean singers
South Korean male television actors
South Korean male film actors
South Korean male pop singers
South Korean male idols
South Korean Christians